Sandro Dori (born Alberto Schiappadori; 21 December 1938 – 15 February 2021) was an Italian film, television and voice actor.

References

External links

1938 births
2021 deaths
Actors from the Province of Mantua
Italian male film actors
Italian male television actors
Italian male voice actors
Italian male stage actors
20th-century Italian male actors
21st-century Italian male actors